Conus colmani is a species of sea snail, a marine gastropod mollusk in the family Conidae, the cone snails and their allies.

Like all species within the genus Conus, these snails are predatory and venomous. They are capable of "stinging" humans, therefore live ones should be handled carefully or not at all.

Taxonomy
Conus colmani is part of a species complex including Conus albellus, Conus lizardensis and Conus limpusi, that needs re-evaluation. For conservation implications, all are here tentatively listed as distinct species.

Description
The size of an adult shell varies between 35 mm and 52 mm.

Distribution
This marine species is endemic to Australia and is found off Queensland.

References

 Röckel, D. & Korn, W. 1990. Zur Indentitat von Conus lizardensis Crosse, 1865 und Conus sibogae Schepman, 1913– mit Beschreibung dreier neuer Conus-Arten von Queensland, Australien (Mollusca: Conidae). Acta Conchyliorum 2: 5–23, pls 1–10
 Wilson, B. 1994. Australian Marine Shells. Prosobranch Gastropods. Kallaroo, WA : Odyssey Publishing Vol. 2 370 pp. 
 Röckel, D., Korn, W. & Kohn, A.J. 1995. Manual of the Living Conidae. Volume 1: Indo-Pacific Region. Wiesbaden : Hemmen 517 pp.
 Filmer R.M. (2001). A Catalogue of Nomenclature and Taxonomy in the Living Conidae 1758 – 1998. Backhuys Publishers, Leiden. 388pp.
 Tucker J.K. (2009). Recent cone species database. September 4, 2009 Edition
 Tucker J.K. & Tenorio M.J. (2009) Systematic classification of Recent and fossil conoidean gastropods. Hackenheim: Conchbooks. 296 pp.
 Puillandre N., Duda T.F., Meyer C., Olivera B.M. & Bouchet P. (2015). One, four or 100 genera? A new classification of the cone snails. Journal of Molluscan Studies. 81: 1–23

External links
 The Conus Biodiversity website
 
 Cone Shells – Knights of the Sea

colmani
Gastropods described in 1990
Fauna of Queensland
Gastropods of Australia